Klenovec is a village and municipality in the Rimavská Sobota District of the Banská Bystrica Region of southern Slovakia. The village had been once a residency of Juraj Jánošík, a legendary Slovak folk hero. Near Klenovec  is a big water reservoir. Most important sightseeings are classical houses from the beginning of 19th century and a classical evangelical church.

Notable personalities
Vladimír Mináč, writer

Genealogical resources

The records for genealogical research are available at the state archive "Statny Archiv in Banska Bystrica, Slovakia"

 Roman Catholic church records (births/marriages/deaths): 1830-1896 (parish B)
 Greek Catholic church records (births/marriages/deaths): 1775-1928 (parish B)
 Lutheran church records (births/marriages/deaths): 1845-1895 (parish A)

See also
 List of municipalities and towns in Slovakia

References

External links
 
 
https://web.archive.org/web/20131012053526/http://portal.statistics.sk/files/obce-pohl-vek.pdf
http://www.e-obce.sk/obec/klenovec/klenovec.html
Surnames of living people in Klenovec

Villages and municipalities in Rimavská Sobota District